WISEPA J184124.74+700038.0 (designation is abbreviated to WISE 1841+7000) is a binary system of brown dwarfs of spectral classes T5 + T5, located in constellation Draco at approximately 131 light-years from Earth. It is notable for being one of the first known binary brown dwarf systems.

Discovery
WISE 1841+7000 was discovered in 2011 from data, collected by Wide-field Infrared Survey Explorer (WISE) Earth-orbiting satellite — NASA infrared-wavelength 40 cm (16 in) space telescope, which mission lasted from December 2009 to February 2011. WISE 1841+7000A has two discovery papers: Gelino et al. (2011) and Kirkpatrick et al. (2011). Gelino et al. examined for binarity nine brown dwarfs using Laser Guide Star Adaptive Optics system (LGS-AO) on Keck II telescope on Mauna Kea; seven of these nine brown dwarfs were also newfound, including WISE 1841+7000. These observations had indicated that two of these nine brown dwarfs, including WISE 1841+7000, are binary. Kirkpatrick et al. presented discovery of 98 new found by WISE brown dwarf systems with components of spectral types M, L, T and Y, among which also was WISE 1841+7000.

Discovery of companion
Component B of the system was discovered in 2011 Gelino et al. with Laser Guide Star Adaptive Optics system (LGS-AO) on Keck II telescope. It was presented in the same article as the component A.

Distance
Trigonometric parallax of WISE 1841+7000 is not yet measured. Therefore, there are only distance estimates of this object, obtained by indirect — spectrofotometric — means (see table).

WISE 1841+7000 distance estimates

Non-trigonometric distance estimates are marked in italic. The best estimate is marked in bold.

See also
The other eight objects, checked for binarity by Gelino et al. (2011) on Keck II:
binarity found:
WISE 0458+6434 (T8.5 + T9.5, component A discovered before by Mainzer et al. (2011))
binarity not found:
WISE 0750+2725 (T8.5, newfound)
WISE 1322-2340 (T8, newfound)
WISE 1614+1739 (T9, newfound)
WISE 1617+1807 (T8, discovered before by Burgasser et al. (2011))
WISE 1627+3255 (T6, newfound)
WISE 1653+4444 (T8, newfound)
WISE 1741+2553 (T9, newfound)

Notes

References

Binary stars
Brown dwarfs
T-type stars
Draco (constellation)
WISE objects